Kansas's 30th Senate district is one of 40 districts in the Kansas Senate. It has been represented by Republican Susan Wagle, the President of the Senate, since 2001; Wagle will be succeeded by fellow Republican Renee Erickson in 2021.

Geography
District 30 covers eastern Wichita and its immediate suburbs in Sedgwick County, including Eastborough and a small part of Andover.

The district is located entirely within Kansas's 4th congressional district, and overlaps with the 83rd, 85th, 87th, 88th, and 99th districts of the Kansas House of Representatives.

Recent election results

2020

2016

2012

Federal and statewide results in District 30

References

30
Sedgwick County, Kansas